Naoi is a Japanese surname. Notable people with the surname include:

, Japanese goalball player
, Japanese goalball player

Japanese-language surnames